Salad Days (stylized as SALAD DAYS) is a Japanese manga series written and illustrated by Shinobu Inokuma. It was first serialized in Shogakukan's shōnen manga magazine Shōnen Sunday Super and later in Weekly Shōnen Sunday. The manga is a collection of romance stories in a high school and college setting, covering various aspects of romance and relationships from finding love to dealing with it, and the pain that can come from it. Almost all of the stories are standalone with one exception that becomes a recurring storyline at various points in the last two-thirds of the manga. Characters featured in other stories will often show up in the current story as part of the supporting cast.

Publication
Salad Days is written and illustrated by Shinobu Inokuma. The series was first published in Shogakukan's Shōnen Sunday Super from 1997 to 1998. It was later serialized in Weekly Shōnen Sunday from 1998 to 2001. Shogakukan collected its chapters in eighteen tankōbon volumes, released from May 18, 1998, to February 18, 2002.

In Indonesia, the manga was published by M&C!.

Another series, titled , was serialized in Nihon Bungeisha's Comic Heaven from 2016 to 2017. Two tankōbon volumes were released on November 28, 2016, and November 29, 2017.

Volume list

References

External links 
 

1998 manga
Nihon Bungeisha manga
Romance anime and manga
School life in anime and manga
Seinen manga
Shogakukan manga
Shōnen manga